The Jósika estate in Surduc, a village in Sălaj County, Romania, consists of a low-rise castle on the left bank of Someș River and a tempietto built on a steep cliff at the entrance from Jibou into the village. Here lived and worked between 1834 and 1853 writer Miklós Jósika, founder of the Hungarian romantic novel. Between the walls of the castle, he wrote the historical novel , his style being likened to Scottish writer Walter Scott. Members of the Jósika family, originating in the north of the current Hunedoara County, contributed significantly to the erection and final appearance of the castle. It is important from a historical perspective, because here Prince of Transylvania Francis II Rákóczi served a last lunch with László Csáky before the battle of Zsibó (present-day Jibou) of 15 November 1705, lost to the Austrian imperial army led by General .

The castle is included in the list of historical monuments elaborated by the Ministry of Culture, as a monument of local importance.

History 

In the 17th century, Surduc, and hence the curia, were the property of the Csáky family. From their curia built in the middle of a park has not been preserved but the servants' house. The curia was turned into castle probably in the 18th century, because in the early 19th century the building is already registered as a castle. In 1810 it became the property of the Jósika family. After his first failed marriage to Erzsébet Kállay from Nagykálló (Hungary), writer Miklós Jósika (1794–1865) retreated to this castle. Miklós' maternal grandmother was a descendant of the Csáky family. He built several farm buildings here, including a stud farm, and revitalized the estate. The castle was later inherited by Miklos' son Leó (1827–1887), who left the castle to his daughter, Baroness Irén Jósika (1853–1940).

A family property inventory from 1854 records a building consisting of 17 rooms, including the writer's office, and a chapel. Legend has it was built with stone from the nearby Roman castra of Tihău. The castle had a park where subsequently were found several fountains and a statue of Maria Theresa. The entrance to the castle was guarded by two stone lions, moved in the late 1970s to the garden of Wesselényi Castle in Jibou. On the main alley, there is a baroque church, and the main salon of the castle was full of remarkable pictures. The pieces of furniture were hand-carved, and the chandeliers surprised by elegance and refinement. The revolutionaries of 1848 damaged the castle, so in the last third of the 19th century other construction works were needed.

The establishment of the communist regime in Romania led to the transformation of the castle into a station for mechanization of agriculture (SMA). Many valuable pieces have disappeared or were destroyed during this period. Its old ornate gate was replaced by a bulky concrete frame, while the former park was transformed into a vegetable garden. At present, the castle, together with the related land, belongs to the Agromec company, founded in 1991. In 2022, the Jósika Castle was put up for sale by Sotheby's International Realty for the price of 560,000 euros.

Jósika family's crypt 
The crypt, a tempietto-like structure known locally as the "baron's crypt", was built in 1825, in the memory of Miklós Jósika's father who died a year before. On the facade can be read Parenti optimo pietas proculium posuit ano. MDCCCXXVII-mo, an inscription executed in 1828 by Friedrich Hirschfeld, a sculptor from Debrecen. Initially, in the now empty and looted crypt, there were three cast iron coffins, two of them with windows.

Architecture 
The castle is simple, built on one level, the corners of the two main facades being accentuated by a bastion. One of the bastions is round, the other has a hexagonal shape. From the round bastion, the main entrance used to open, in front of it there was a small porch, which is no longer visible today.

The semicircular door and the two semicircular windows with an opening to the main facade have been preserved. Above them are simple frames. The rear and side facades of the building are simple, without ornaments. The rear facade of the castle forms the letter U, one wing being shorter and narrower than the other. Some parts of the building are the result of later construction.

References

External links 

 3D model of Jósika Castle at Sketchfab

Castles in Romania
Jósika family
Buildings and structures in Sălaj County
Historic monuments in Sălaj County